Real River or Rio Real may refer to:

 Real River (Brazil)
 Real River (Portugal), a river of Portugal
 Rio Real, a municipality in Bahia, Brazil

See also
 Campo Real River, Paraná, Brazil
 Rea River, Fiordland, New Zealand